David Libert (born January 20, 1943) is an American music executive, musician and author. He was one of the founding members of the musical group, The Happenings. Hailing from Paterson, New Jersey, United States, The Happenings had several hit records including "See You in September" and a cover of "I Got Rhythm" that was on the Billboard Hot 100 Singles charts for 14 weeks in 1967, and peaked at number 3.

Libert later left the group to join the Willard Alexander Agency as a booking agent.  After a brief stint as road manager for Rare Earth, Libert became tour manager for Alice Cooper during Alice's most formidable years (1971–1975). Libert figured prominently in Bob Greene's book about accompanying Cooper's band on 1973's Billion Dollar Babies tour, Billion Dollar Baby .  Libert also was credited for singing background vocals on the Billion Dollar Babies album which was recorded at Morgan Studios in London in 1973.

In 1975, Libert migrated from New York to Los Angeles and in 1976, he opened the David Libert Agency which represented George Clinton, Parliament/Funkadelic, Bootsy's Rubber Band and The Runaways (Cherie Currie, Joan Jett, Lita Ford).  In the late 90s, Libert formed Available Entertainment with entertainment attorney Alan Oken. A personal management company, Available Entertainment went on to represent George Clinton, Parliament/Funkadelic, Brian Auger, Living Colour, Sheila E, Vanilla Fudge, Cactus, Iranian singer, writer, performer Sussan Deyhim,  Skye Issac, The Fabulous Miss Wendy,  The Coryell Auger Sample Trio and Tomi Rae Brown.  Libert also wrote hit songs for other artists including The Tokens, The Chiffons and Gerry & The Pacemakers.  Libert has promoted many concerts throughout his career including sold out shows at Madison Square Garden in New York (George Clinton) and the Cricket Wireless Amphitheater in Kansas City (Kool and the Gang) His record producing credits include co-producing The Happenings album, Piece of Mind, with fellow Happenings member Bobby Miranda, as well as producing on his own, Tomi Rae Brown, Attus, Steel Water Blue and Eric Kellogg's Imaginary Band. Libert has recently finished writing his autobiography, "Rock and Roll Warrior"(ISBN 978-1-68524-435-4) which was released on September 23, 2022 by Sunset Blvd Books. Libert continues to reside in Southern California.

References

External links
Available Entertainment

1943 births
Living people
Record producers from New Jersey
Songwriters from New Jersey
Musicians from Paterson, New Jersey
Talent managers